Karnasubarner Guptodhon is an Indian Bengali  adventure thriller film directed by Dhrubo Banerjee and produced by Shrikant Mohta and Mahendra Soni. It is a sequel to Durgeshgorer Guptodhon and the third film in Sona Da franchise. The film released on 30 September, 2022, coinciding with Durga Puja, under the banner of SVF Entertainment.  The film was a blockbuster at the box office and one of the highest-grossing Bengali films of all time, earning millions worldwide.

Plot
Invited for a wonderful occasion, the trio, Subarna Sen aka Sonada, Abir and Jhinuk, discovers an old riddle that talks about the hidden treasures of King Shashanka. They follow a perilous trail to find it. As they face resistance from an old foe and face threats, the quest for the greatest treasure becomes a dangerous hunt for power and wealth. Sonada rushes to unlock every clue and crack the riddle, to make sure his loved ones are safe.

Cast 
 Abir Chatterjee as Professor Subarna Sen aka. Sona da
 Arjun Chakrabarty as Abirlal Roy/Abir
 Ishaa Saha as Jhinuk Majumdar
 Rajatava Dutta as Dashanan Daw
 Kamaleshwar Mukherjee as Akhilesh Majumdar 
 Sourav Das as Bhujanga Hazra
 Barun Chanda as Biswambar Bandopadhyay
 Kinjal Nanda as Pitambar

Soundtrack
The background score and the soundtracks are composed by Bickram Ghosh and lyrics are penned down by Sugata Guha.

Theatrical Release 
The film was released in theaters on 30 September 2022, on the occasion of Durga Puja. It simultaneously released in cities like Bengaluru, Delhi, Guwahati, Tezpur, Mumbai and other parts of India including Kolkata and entire West Bengal. It also released in the United States , Netherlands and Australia.

Reception

Box office
More than 20,000 tickets were sold in advance by 29 September, before the film's release. The film sold 80%–90% of its tickets on its release day. The film grossed around  crores in its first weekend and  crores in its first week.

Critical response
The Times of India rated the film 4/5 in its reviews. The newspaper described the film as "a fun-packed adventure with a touch of history" and praised it for serving "its purpose to entertain."  Firstpost
described the film as "There is another treasure hunt beckoning Citizen Sonada." and regarded the plot as "craftily assembled but finally an unremarkable treasure-hunt story."

References

External links
 https://www.hoichoi.tv/movies/watch-karna-subarner-guptodhon-movie-trailer-online

2022 films
Bengali-language Indian films
2020s Bengali-language films
2020s adventure thriller films
Indian adventure thriller films
Films scored by Bickram Ghosh